Tortuga: Two Treasures is an action-adventure video game developed by German studio Ascaron Entertainment. It was released on March 12, 2007.

Reception
Tortuga: Two Treasures received "generally unfavorable" reviews according to the review aggregator site Metacritic, which assigns a rating on a 0-100 scale. It received a 48/100 based on 17 critics.

Brock Smith for GameZone gave it a 6/10. Brett Tod for GameSpot gave the game a 4.8/10. Allen Rausch for GameSpy gave the game 2/5 stars. Darren Allen of Eurogamer gave it a 4/10. Martin Gaston for GameWatcher gave it a rating of 3/10. Gord Goble of IGN awarded the game a rating of 5/10.

References

2007 video games
Action-adventure games
Ascaron games
Age of Discovery video games
Windows games
Windows-only games
Video games about pirates
Video games developed in Germany
Video games set in the Caribbean
Single-player video games